DFAC may refer to:
 Dongfeng Automobile Company, a Chinese automobile company
 Dunedin Fine Art Center, a museum in Dunedin, Florida, U.S.
 A U.S. Army acronym for Dining Facilities Administration Center, a dining facility or mess